The Baystate Marathon is a marathon held in the city of Lowell, MA every October. It was first run in 1990 and has been run every year since then. The course is known as one of the flattest and fastest marathon courses in the northeastern United States. The race runs along the Merrimack River and crosses different bridges spanning this river. This fast course is often used by many runners to garner a qualifying time for the Boston Marathon as it's one of the top BQ marathons in the US. Besides the (Full) marathon, there is also a Half-Marathon and Half-Marathon Relay. 

For over 30 years, it has come to be known as a race that is “For Runners - By Runners”. The race is one of the few remaining marathons fully hosted and executed by a running club rather than a for-profit company. The Greater Lowell Road Runners use the funds that are raised from the race to fulfill the mission of promoting and encouraging the sport of running through road races, fun runs, group training activities, lectures and social events.

External links

Baystate Marathon Results

Marathons in the United States
Sports competitions in Massachusetts
Massachusetts culture
Recurring sporting events established in 1990
Sports in Lowell, Massachusetts
Annual events in Massachusetts
Annual sporting events in the United States
1990 establishments in Massachusetts